The Termite-flg RNA motif (also called tg-flg) is a conserved RNA structure identified by bioinformatics.  Genomic sequences corresponding to Termite-flg RNAs have been identified only in uncultivated bacteria present in the termite hindgut.  As of 2010 it has not been identified in the DNA of any cultivated species, and is thus an example of RNAs present in environmental samples.

Termite-flg RNAs are consistently located in what is presumed to be the 5' untranslated regions of genes that encode proteins whose functions relate to flagella.  The RNAs are hypothesized to regulate these genes in an unknown mechanism.

References

External links
 

Cis-regulatory RNA elements